Fabiana Sgroi (born 13 May 1981 in Palermo) is an Italian sprint canoeist who competed in the late 2000s. At the 2008 Summer Olympics in Beijing, she finished eighth in the K-4 500 m event while being eliminated in the semifinals of the K-2 500 m event.

References
 Sports-Reference.com profile

1981 births
Canoeists at the 2008 Summer Olympics
Italian female canoeists
Living people
Olympic canoeists of Italy
Sportspeople from Palermo
Mediterranean Games gold medalists for Italy
Mediterranean Games silver medalists for Italy
Mediterranean Games medalists in canoeing
Competitors at the 2005 Mediterranean Games